Jingba Road Subdistrict  is a subdistrict in Jinshui District, Zhengzhou in the province of Henan, China.

See also
List of township-level divisions of Henan

References

Township-level divisions of Henan
Zhengzhou